Klewki  is a village in the administrative district of Gmina Purda, within Olsztyn County, Warmian-Masurian Voivodeship, in northern Poland. It is located in Warmia.

The village has a population of 1,500.

The historic landmarks of Klewki are the Saints Valentine and Roch church and the old manor house. A railway station is located in the village.

References

Klewki